Wayne Sulo Aho (24 August 1916 – 16 January 2006) was an American contactee who claimed contact with extraterrestrial beings. He was one of the more obscure members of the 1950s wave of contactees who followed George Adamski.

Early life
Born in the state of Washington, Aho was one of seven children of Finnish homesteaders and worked for most of his life as a logger. He was a captain in the United States Army Coast Artillery Corps in the 1940s.

Like Howard Menger, Aho claimed to have been in contact with humanoid space aliens since childhood, in his case the age of 12. He mainly spoke about a contact occurring in 1957, the year he claimed to have been initiated as a "Cosmic Master of Wisdom" after attending contactee George Van Tassel's Giant Rock Interplanetary Space Craft Convention. Aho said a telepathic summons led him into the desert where a saucer appeared and a voice ordered him to go forth and create his own yearly convention in his home state of Washington.

Contactee career 
Aho and fellow 1957, contactee Reinhold O. Schmidt went on the lecture circuit together in California, and their double-header lectures continued until Schmidt was arrested for and convicted of grand theft.  Aho's presentations tended to emphasize his military service in World War II, and spent very little time on "spiritual revelations" he had received from the Space Brothers, either directly or through later sessions with a spirit medium.  Aho tended to refer to himself as "Major W. S. Aho," inviting confusion with Major Donald E. Keyhoe, a UFO researcher and writer who thought UFOs were real but held contactees in low regard.

Aho soon fell under the spell of another one-time Adamski follower, Otis T. Carr.  Carr claimed to have built a full-size flying saucer operating on authentic Adamskian or Teslarian "magnetic" principles, and after a suitable amount of money had been collected from gullible elderly attendees at the lectures of Aho and Carr, they announced the Carr saucer, piloted by Carr and Aho, would take off from a fairground in front of thousands of witnesses and fly to the moon, returning with incontrovertible proof of the trip. Criminal charges against both Aho and Carr resulted from the inevitable public fiasco, but Aho was judged to be an innocent dupe.

Cult established and later life
Like almost all of the 1950s contactees, including George Adamski, Truman Bethurum,
Daniel Fry, George King and many others, Aho did get around to founding his own
religious cult, based on the teachings of the Space Brothers: in Aho's case, the Church of the New Age, in Seattle, Washington.  Following the instructions of the Space Brothers, Aho's yearly convention held near the entrance to Mount Rainier National Park, in the so-called Spacecraft Protective Landing Area for Advancement of Science and Humanities (SPLAASH), created in honor of Kenneth Arnold, tended to emphasize New Age theories of various kinds rather than being strictly a meeting-place for flying saucer fans.

Aho spent the last decade of his life in Gardnerville, Nevada. He died on January 16, 2006, in Carson City, Nevada.

References 
 Lewis, James R., editor, UFOs and Popular Culture, Santa Barbara, CA: ABC-CLIO, Inc., 2000. .
 Curran, Douglas. In Advance of the Landing, NY, NY: Abbeville Press, 1985.  .

External links 
 About Aho's "New Dawn" conferences
 Aho in 1965
 A brief TIME magazine writeup on Aho
 Overview of 1950s Contactees
 Long John Nebel's radio interviews with 1950s contactees
 Otis T. Carr's flying saucer

Contactees
American people of Finnish descent
People from Seattle
UFO religions
1916 births
2006 deaths
People from Gardnerville, Nevada